Must Be Santa is a 1999 Canadian television film that tells the story of Floyd Court (Arnold Pinnock), who is selected as the successor to Santa Claus. Robert Sherrin produced the film while Brad Turner was director.

At the time of its release, it was considered to be one of the most expensive such projects ever produced by the Canadian Broadcasting Corporation. It was made more expensive when production of the film was interrupted in February 1999 by a strike of the CBC's technicians. Production resumed in May after a labor settlement.

Joe Flaherty makes an appearance as his SCTV character Count Floyd.

The film won a Gemini Award in 2000 for Best Visual Effects.

Universal Studios provided international distribution.

Cast
 Arnold Pinnock - Floyd Court
 Dabney Coleman - Tuttle
 Deanna Milligan - Natalie Fairlie
 Joe Flaherty - Count Floyd
 Keenan MacWilliam - Heather

See also 
 List of Christmas films
 Santa Claus in film

References

External links
 CBC: Must Be Santa
 

1999 films
Canadian television specials
CBC Television original programming
Christmas television films
Christmas television specials
Films directed by Brad Turner
Canadian Screen Award-winning television shows
Santa Claus in film
1990s Canadian films